Escuela Internacional de Cine y TV (Spanish), abbreviated EICTV -  (The International Film and TV School) - was founded on December 15, 1986, by Colombian journalist and writer Gabriel Garcia Marquez, Cuban theoreticians and filmmakers Julio García Espinosa and Tomás Gutiérrez Alea, Argentinean poet and filmmaker Fernando Birri, all four former students of the film school at Cinecittà in Rome, and amongst others, Brazilian filmmakers Orlando Senna and Sergio Muniz. It is located in San Antonio de Los Baños, Artemisa Province, Cuba.

The school provides a comprehensive theoretical and practical cinema education, within a completely self-sufficient environment and community for its students, faculty members, workers and staff. Each year around 40 students from Latin America, Africa, Asia and Europe are selected to complete the Curso Regular (Regular Course). During this intensive three-year period, each student specialises in one of the following disciplines: Documentary Direction, Fiction Direction, Sound, TV & New Media, and Screenwriting. Along with the Curso Regular, the EICTV also offers international workshops.

Alumni
 Mariana Rondón
 Jorge Molina
 Benito Zambrano
 Jaime Rosales
 Miguel Coyula
 Amat Escalante
 Adamo Pedro Bronzoni
 Ana Caridad Sánchez

References

External links
 

Film schools in Cuba